ICET, ICE.T or variant, may refer to:

People 
 Ice-T (born 1958), American rapper and actor
 Allen Icet (born 1957), Missouri politician

Other 

 Ice tea or Iced tea, a beverage made from tea and ice
 ICE T, a variant of the German ICE high-speed train

 Aechmea 'Ice-T', a Bromeliad cultivar flowering plant
 Institute for the Certification of Engineering Technicians, part of the National Institute for Certification in Engineering Technologies
 International Coalition to End Torture, a global NGO
 International Consultation on English Texts, now named the English Language Liturgical Consultation, a worldwide association

See also 

 Intermodal Surface Transportation Efficiency Act (ISTEA)